The 2020 Troféu Brasil de Atletismo was the national club championships in outdoor track and field for Brazil, also effectively serving as the top level national competition for individuals. It was held from 10–13 December at the Centro Olímpico de Treinamento e Pesquisa in São Paulo. The competition was originally scheduled earlier in the year, but the events were delayed due to the COVID-19 pandemic. This necessitated a change of location and events were carried out without an audience.

Results

Men

Women

References

Results
 Brazilian Ch. COTP Stadium, São Paulo (BRA) 10–13 DEC 2020. World Athletics. Retrieved 2021-03-19.

2020
Troféu Brasil de Atletismo
Troféu Brasil de Atletismo
Troféu Brasil de Atletismo
Sports competitions in São Paulo
Troféu Brasil de Atletismo, 2020